The Bay Pines Site is a historic site in Bay Pines, Florida. It is located on the property of the Veterans' Administration Medical Center in Bay Pines. On February 23, 1983, it was added to the U.S. National Register of Historic Places.

References

External links
 Pinellas County listings at National Register of Historic Places
 Pinellas County listings at Florida's Office of Cultural and Historical Programs

Mounds in Florida
Native American history of Florida
Archaeological sites in Florida
National Register of Historic Places in Pinellas County, Florida